There are three species of bird called pied fantail.
 Malaysian pied fantail, Rhipidura javanica
 Philippine pied fantail, Rhipidura nigritorquis
 the pied morph of New Zealand fantail, Rhipidura fuliginosa

Animal common name disambiguation pages